Domenico Padovano (27 September 1940 – 10 May 2019) was an Italian Catholic prelate.

Born in Mola di Bari, Padovano was ordained to the priesthood in 1965, and held several auxiliary bishop roles of the Archdiocese of Bari-Bitonto during the 1980s. He was appointed Bishop of Conversano-Monopoli in 1987, serving until his retirement in 2016.

Padovano died on 10 May 2019 in Mola di Bari, at the age of 78.

References

1940 births
2019 deaths
20th-century Italian Roman Catholic bishops
People from Apulia
21st-century Italian Roman Catholic bishops